Angwin is a Cornish language surname that means ('the white') and may refer to 

Angwin, California
Andy Angwin, Australian rules footballer
H. T. M. Angwin (1888–1949), engineer and public servant in South Australia
Laurence Angwin, Australian rules footballer and grandson of Andy
Richard Angwin, BBC weatherman

Cornish-language surnames